The American chestnut (Castanea dentata) is a large, fast-growing deciduous tree of the beech family native to eastern North America. As is true of all species in genus Castanea, the American chestnut produces burred fruit with edible nuts. The American chestnut was one of the most important forest trees throughout its range.

During the early to mid 20th century, American chestnut trees were devastated by chestnut blight, a fungal disease that came from Chinese chestnut trees that were introduced into North America from East Asia. It is estimated that the blight killed between 3 and 4 billion American chestnut trees in the first half of the 20th century, beginning in 1904. Very few mature specimens of the tree exist within its historical range, although many small shoots of the former live trees remain. There are hundreds of large (2 to 5 ft diameter) American chestnuts outside its historical range, some in areas where less virulent strains of the pathogen are more common, such as the 600 to 800 large trees in Northern Michigan. The species is listed as endangered in the United States and Canada. American chestnuts are also susceptible to ink disease, particularly in the southern part of its native range; this likely contributed to the devastation of the species.

Several groups are attempting to create blight-resistant American chestnuts. Scientists at the SUNY College of Environmental Science and Forestry created the Darling 58 cultivar of American chestnut by inserting the oxalate oxidase gene from wheat into the genome of an American chestnut. When expressed in the vascular cambium of the Darling 58 cultivar, the oxalate oxidase enzyme degrades the oxalic acid produced by the chestnut blight, reducing damage to the vascular cambium and resisting girdling of the trunk. As of 2021, the researchers who developed this cultivar are working toward applying for government permission to make these trees available to the public. If approved, these chestnut trees would be the first genetically modified forest trees released into the wild in the United States. Alternate approaches to developing a blight-resistant cultivar include cross-breeding among partially blight-resistant American chestnuts or crossbreeding with the moderately blight-resistant Chinese chestnut, then backcrossing with the American chestnut, with the goal of retaining most of its genes.

Description

Castanea dentata is a rapidly–growing, large, deciduous hardwood tree. (Post-blight sources erroneously report a greater maximum size of the species compared with pre-blight, likely due to nostalgia, to interpretations of pre-blight measurements of circumference as being measurements of diameter, and to the misapprehension that pre-blight observations of maximum size represented observations of average size.) It is considerably larger than the closely related Allegheny Chinquipin Castanea pumila.

There are several other chestnut species, such as the European sweet chestnut (C. sativa), Chinese chestnut (C. mollissima), and Japanese chestnut (C. crenata). It has larger and more widely spaced saw-teeth on the edges of its leaves, as indicated by the scientific name dentata, Latin for "toothed".

The European sweet chestnut was introduced in the United States by Thomas Jefferson in 1773. The European sweet chestnut has hairy twig tips in contrast to the hairless twigs of the American chestnut. This species has been the chief source of commercial chestnuts in the United States. Japanese chestnut was inadvertently introduced into the United States by Thomas Hogg in 1876 and planted on the property of S. B. Parsons in Flushing, New York. The Japanese chestnut has narrow leaves, smaller than either American chestnut or sweet chestnut, with small, sharply-pointed teeth and many hairs on the underside of the leaf and is the most blight-resistant species.

The chestnut is monoecious, and usually protandrous producing many small, pale green (nearly white) male flowers found tightly occurring along 6 to 8 inch long catkins. The female parts are found near the base of the catkins (near twig) and appear in late spring to early summer. Like all members of the family Fagaceae, American chestnut is self-incompatible and requires two trees for pollination, which can be with other members of the Castanea genus. The pollen of the American chestnut is considered a mild allergen.

The American chestnut is a prolific bearer of nuts, with inflorescence and nut production in the wild beginning when a tree is 8 to 10 years old. American chestnut burrs often open while still attached to the tree, around the time of the first frost in autumn, with the nuts then falling to the ground. American chestnut typically have three nuts enclosed in a spiny, green burr, each lined in tan velvet. In contrast, the Allegheny Chinquipin produces but one nut per burr.

Evolution and ecology
Chestnuts are in the Fagaceae family along with beech and oak. Chestnuts are not closely related to the horse-chestnut, which is in the family Sapindaceae. Phylogenetic analysis indicates a westward migration of extant Castanea species from Asia to Europe to North America, with the American Chestnut more closely related to the Allegheny Chinquipin (Castanea pumila v. pumila) than to European or Asian clades. The genomic range of chestnuts can be roughly divided into a clinal pattern of northeast, central, and southwest populations, with southwest populations showing greatest diversity, reflecting an evolutionary bottleneck likely due to Quaternary glaciation. Two lineages of American chestnut have been identified, one a hybrid between the American chestnut and the Allegheny Chinquipin from the southern Appalachians. The other lineage of American Chestnut shows a gradual loss of genetic diversity along a Northward vector, indicating possible expansion of range following the most recent Glacial Maximum during the Wisconsin glaciation. Ozark chinkapin, which is typically considered either a distinct species (C. ozarkensis) or a subspecies of the Allegheny chinkapin (C. pumila subsp. ozarkensis), may be ancestral to both the American chestnut and the Allegheny chinkapin. A natural hybrid of C. dentata and C. pumila has been named Castanea × neglecta.

The American chestnut population was reduced to 1–10% of its original size as a result of the chestnut blight and has not recovered. The surviving trees are “frozen in time” with shoots re-sprouting from survivor rootstock but almost entirely undergoing blight-induced dieback without producing chestnuts. Unexpectedly, American chestnut appears to have retained substantial genetic diversity following the population bottleneck, which is at odds with the limited incidence of blight resistance/tolerance in extant populations.

The pre-blight distribution of the American Chestnut was restricted to moist but well-drained steep slopes with acid loam soils. According to analysis of old forest dust data, the tree was rare or absent in New England prior to 2,500 years before the present, but rapidly established dominance in these forests, becoming a common tree over a range from Maine and southern Ontario to Mississippi, and from the Atlantic coast to the Appalachian Mountains and the Ohio Valley. In Pennsylvania, it is estimated to have comprised 25–30% of all hardwoods.

The tree's abundance was due to a combination of rapid growth, relative fire resistance, and a large annual nut crop in comparison to oaks which do not reliably produce sizable numbers of acorns every year. Fire was common in the pre-blight ecosystem of the American Chestnut, perhaps in part due to unique traits of the tree, including fire tolerance, highly flammable litter, tall stature, rapid growth, and ability to resprout. Historically, the mean fire return interval was 20 years or less in chestnut-predominant ecologies, with a forest stand pattern that was more open than is currently the case.

The American chestnut was an important tree for wildlife, providing much of the fall mast for species such as white-tailed deer, wild turkey, Allegheny woodrat and (prior to its extinction) the passenger pigeon. Black bears were also known to eat the nuts to fatten up for the winter. The American chestnut also contains more nitrogen, phosphorus, potassium and magnesium in its leaves than other trees that share its habitat, so they return more nutrients to the soil which helps with the growth of other plants, animals, and microorganisms. The American chestnut is preferred by some avian seed hoarders, and was particularly important as a food source during years where the oak mast failed.

Parasites of American chestnut

Chestnut blight

Prior to the Chestnut blight, the American chestnut was a dominant tree in the ecosystem of the eastern deciduous forest. It was said that a squirrel could walk from New England to Georgia solely on the branches of American chestnuts. Once an important hardwood timber tree, the American chestnut suffered a catastrophic population collapse due to the chestnut blight, a disease caused by an Asian bark fungus (Cryphonectria parasitica, formerly Endothia parasitica). The fungus was introduced when infected Japanese chestnut trees were brought to North America in the late 19th century. Chestnut blight was first noticed on American chestnut trees in what was then the New York Zoological Park, now known as the Bronx Zoo, in the borough of The Bronx, New York City, in 1904, by chief forester Hermann Merkel. Merkel estimated that by 1906 blight had infected 98 percent of the chestnut trees in the borough. While Asian chestnut species evolved with the blight and developed a strong resistance, the American chestnut and Allegheny chinquapin have little resistance. The airborne bark fungus spread  a year and in a few decades girdled and killed up to three billion American chestnut trees. Salvage logging during the early years of the blight may have unwittingly destroyed trees that had high levels of resistance to the disease and thus aggravated the calamity. New shoots often sprout from the roots when the main stem dies, so the species has not yet become extinct. It was recorded in the 1900s that the chestnut blight would commonly reinfect any novel stems that grew from the stumps, therefore maintaining a cycle that would prevent the American chestnut tree from re-establishing. However, some American chestnut trees have survived because of a small natural resistance to the chestnut blight.

Chestnut blight is not to be confused with sun scald, where winter sun reflects off of snow, warming the bark on the sun-facing trunk. (This would be the south-facing trunk in the Northern Hemisphere.) This snow-reflected sunlight repeatedly warms and thaws the trunk during the day, resulting in vulnerability of the bark and cambium to freezing cold temperatures during the subsequent night, eventually resulting in bark cankers that resemble chestnut blight. Also, sun scald makes the damaged bark vulnerable to invasion by pathogens.

Ink disease

Before the onset of chestnut blight and prior to 1824, an epidemic of ink disease struck American chestnuts, most likely brought to the southern United States on imported cork oak trees from Portugal. This fungal pathogen is known to also kill the roots and collars of several Castanea species, including the European species C. sativa. It affected primarily chestnuts in the Southeastern US and at the later time when chestnut blight struck, the range of C. dentata may have already been reduced. The potential range of blight-resistant American chestnuts is substantially reduced if those chestnuts are susceptible to ink disease. Further, the range of this pathogen will extend northward as the climate warms, which may further limit the potential range of the American Chestnut.

Chinese gall wasp
The Chinese gall wasp attacks all Chestnut species and causes heavy damage. As this species of wasp is a threat to saplings, and is now widely-present in Eastern North American forests, it is a potential problem for reintroduction of the American chestnut. The Chinese parasitoid chalcid wasp Torymus sinensis Kamijo is considered an effective control method for the Chinese gall wasp. There are now established populations of Torymus sinensis Kamijo in North America.

Reduced population
The total number of chestnut trees in eastern North America was estimated at over three billion, and 25% of the trees in the Appalachian Mountains were American chestnut. American chestnuts were also a common part of the forest canopy in southeast Michigan.

Although large trees are currently rare east of the Mississippi River, they exist in pockets in the blight-free West, where the habitat was agreeable for planting: settlers took seeds of American chestnut with them in the 19th century. Huge planted chestnut trees can be found in Sherwood, Oregon, as the Mediterranean climate of the West Coast discourages the fungus, which relies on hot, humid summer weather. American chestnut also thrives as far north as Revelstoke, British Columbia.

At present, it is believed that survival of C. dentata for more than a decade in its native range is almost impossible. The fungus uses various oak trees as a host, and while the oak itself is unaffected, American chestnuts nearby will succumb to the blight in approximately a year or more. In addition, the hundreds of chestnut stumps and "living stools" dotting eastern woodlands may still contain active pathogens. It is considered extirpated from Florida and Illinois.

The reduced population of American chestnuts directly impacted many species of insects that relied upon the tree species for survival. Of approximately 60 species that feed upon the American chestnut, seven rely entirely on the American chestnut as a food source. Some of these, like the American chestnut moth, are now extinct or severely reduced in population.

Attempts at restoration

Transgenic blight-resistant American chestnut

Researchers at the State University of New York College of Environmental Science and Forestry (SUNY ESF), have developed partially blight-resistant transgenic American chestnuts that are capable of surviving infection by Cryphonectria parasitica. This was done by inserting a specific gene from wheat, oxalate oxidase, into the American chestnut genome. The enzyme oxalate oxidase is a common fungal defense in plants, and is found in strawberries, bananas, oats, barley, and other cereals. Oxalate oxidase breaks down the oxalic acid which the fungus secretes in the cambium to lower the pH and subsequently kill plant tissues. The chestnut trees which contain this resistance gene can be infected by the chestnut blight, but the tree is not girdled by the resulting canker and heals around the wound. This lets the fungus fulfill its normal lifecycle without the death of the tree. The blight resistance gene is passed down to the tree's offspring to provide subsequent generations with partial blight resistance. In 2015, the researchers applied for government permission to make these trees available to the public. Extensive testing done with the transgenic Darling 58 variant to assess its effects on other species showed that the survival, pollen use, and reproduction of bumble bees were not affected by oxalate oxidase at the typical concentrations found in the pollen of the American chestnut. A deregulation petition for the Darling 58 variant was submitted January 2020 with a public comment period ending October 19, 2020. These trees could be the first genetically modified forest trees released in the wild in the United States.

More recently, the SUNY ESF group has developed transgenic American chestnut trees incorporating both the oxalate oxidase transgene from wheat and the win3.12 promoter transgene from the necklace poplar. In these trees, oxalate oxidase transgene expression is at a low level of expression under basal conditions; under conditions of wounding or tissue infection, the win 3.12 promotor transgene induces expression of the oxalate oxidase transgene to high levels. This stacking of the oxalate oxidase transgene and the win 3.12 transgene is expected to be more metabolically efficient and thereby have greater transgene stability over successive generations compared with the Darling 58 variant. In laboratory bioassays, win3.12-OxO lines showed elevated disease tolerance similar to that exhibited by blight-resistant Chinese chestnut.

Castanea dentata is susceptible to ink disease, particularly in the southern part of its natural range. Unlike Castanea dentata, Castanea crenata exhibits resistance to Phytophthora cinnamomi, the fungal pathogen that causes ink disease. The mechanism of resistance of Castanea crenata to Phytophthora cinnamomi may derive from its expression of the Cast_Gnk2-like gene. Transgenic modification of Castanea dentata with the Cast_Gnk2-like gene may provide a mechanism for developing Castanea dentata trees resistant to Phytophthora cinnamomi. Stacking of the Cast_Gnk2-like gene and the oxalate oxidase gene may provide a means of developing genetically modified Castanea dentata trees resistant to both the chestnut blight and to ink disease.

Intercrossing surviving American chestnuts

American Chestnut Cooperators Foundation (ACCF) is not using crosses with Asian species for blight resistance, but intercrossing among American chestnuts selected for native resistance to the blight, a breeding strategy described by the ACCF as "All-American intercrosses". John Rush Elkins, a research chemist and professor emeritus of chemistry at Concord University, and Gary Griffin, professor of plant pathology at Virginia Tech, think there may be several different characteristics which favor blight resistance. Both Elkins and Griffin have written extensively about the American chestnut. They believe that by making intercrosses among resistant American chestnuts from many locations, they will continue to improve upon the levels of blight resistance to make an American chestnut that can compete in the forest. Griffin, who has been involved with American chestnut restoration for many years, developed a scale for assessing levels of blight resistance, which made it possible to make selections scientifically. He inoculated five-year-old chestnuts with a standard lethal strain of the blight fungus and measured growth of the cankers. Chestnuts with no resistance to blight make rapid-growing, sunken cankers that are deep and kill tissue right to the wood. Resistant chestnuts make slow-growing, swollen cankers that are superficial: live tissue can be recovered under these cankers. The level of blight resistance is judged by periodic measurement of cankers. Grafts from large survivors of the blight epidemic were evaluated following inoculations, and controlled crosses among resistant American chestnut trees were made beginning in 1980. The first "All-American intercrosses" were planted in Virginia Tech's Martin American Chestnut Planting in Giles County, Virginia, and in Beckley, West Virginia. They were inoculated in 1990 and evaluated in 1991 and 1992. Nine of the trees showed resistance equal to their parents, and four of these had resistance comparable to hybrids in the same test. Many ACCF chestnuts have expressed blight resistance equal to or greater than an original blight survivor but so far, only a handful have demonstrated superior, durable blight control. Time will tell if the progeny of these best chestnuts exhibit durable blight resistance in different stress environments.

Backcrossing
Backcrossing as a treatment for blight was first proposed by Charles Burnham of the University of Minnesota in the 1970s. Burnham, a professor emeritus in agronomy and plant genetics who was considered one of the pioneers of maize genetics, realized that experiments conducted by the USDA to cross-breed American chestnuts with European and Asian chestnuts erroneously assumed that a large number of genes were responsible for blight resistance, while it is currently believed the number of responsible genes is low. The USDA abandoned their cross-breeding program and destroyed local plantings around 1960 after failing to produce a blight-resistant hybrid. Burnham's recognition of the USDA's error led to him joining with others to create The American Chestnut Foundation in 1983, with the sole purpose of breeding a blight-resistant American chestnut. The American Chestnut Foundation is backcrossing blight-resistant Chinese chestnut into American chestnut trees, to recover the American growth characteristics and genetic makeup, and then finally intercrossing the advanced backcross generations to eliminate genes for susceptibility to blight. The first backcrossed American chestnut tree, called "Clapper", survived blight for 25 years, and grafts of the tree have been used by The American Chestnut Foundation since 1983. The Pennsylvania chapter of The American Chestnut Foundation, which seeks to restore the American chestnut to the forests of the Mid-Atlantic states, has planted over 22,000 trees.

The Surface Mining Control and Reclamation Act of 1977 requires owners of abandoned coal mines to cover at least 80 percent of their land with vegetation. While many companies planted invasive grasses, others began funding research on planting trees, because they can be more cost-effective, and yield better results. Keith Gilland began planting American chestnut trees in old strip mines in 2008 as a student at Miami University, and to date has planted over 5,000 trees. In 2005, a hybrid tree with mostly American genes was planted on the lawn of the White House. A tree planted in 2005 in the tree library outside the USDA building was still very healthy seven years later; it contains 98% American chestnut DNA and 2% Chinese chestnut DNA. This tree contains enough Chinese chestnut DNA that encodes for systemic resistance genes to resist the blight. This is essential for restoring the American chestnut trees into the Northeast. The Northern Nut Growers Association (NNGA) has also been active in pursuing viable hybrids. From 1962 to 1990, Alfred Szego and other members of the NNGA developed hybrids with Chinese varieties which showed limited resistance. Initially the backcrossing method would breed a hybrid from an American chestnut nut and a Chinese chestnut, the hybrid would then be bred with a normal American chestnut, subsequent breeding would involve a hybrid and an American chestnut or two hybrids, which would increase the genetic makeup of the hybrids primarily American chestnut but still retain the blight resistance of the Chinese chestnut.

Hypovirulence
Hypovirus is the only genus in the family Hypoviridae. Members of this genus infect fungal pathogens and reduce their ability to cause disease (hypovirulence). In particular, the virus infects Cryphonectria parasitica, the fungus that causes chestnut blight, which has enabled infected trees to recover from the blight. The use of hypovirulence to control blight originated in Europe where the fungal virus spread naturally through populations of European chestnuts. The reduced ability of the fungus to cause disease allowed the European chestnut to regenerate, creating large stands of trees. Hypovirulence has also been found in North America, but has not spread effectively. The "Arner Tree" of Southern Ontario is one of the best examples of naturally occurring hypovirulence. It is a mature American chestnut that has recovered from severe infections of chestnut blight. The cankers have healed over and the tree continues to grow vigorously. Scientists have discovered that the chestnut blight remaining on the tree is hypovirulent, although isolates taken from the tree do not have the fungal viruses found in other isolates. Trees inoculated with isolates taken from the Arner tree have shown moderate canker control. The cankers of hypovirulent American chestnut trees occur on the outermost tissues of the tree but the cankers do not spread into the growth tissues of the American chestnut tree, thereby providing it with a resistance.

Surviving specimens

 About 2,500 chestnut trees are growing on 60 acres near West Salem, Wisconsin, which is the world's largest remaining stand of American chestnut. These trees are the descendants of those planted by Martin Hicks, an early settler in the area, who planted fewer than a dozen trees in the late 1800s. Planted outside the natural range of chestnut, these trees escaped the initial onslaught of chestnut blight, but in 1987, scientists found blight in the stand. Scientists are working to try to save the trees.
 Some 1,348 chestnut trees, varying in size from seedlings to nearly mature trees, are growing in a forest in Western Maine. These chestnuts were originally established in 1982 from four seed-bearing trees sourced from wild stock of a northern Michigan relict population. This grove of trees has dispersed over an area up to 370 meters from the parent trees. The trees appear to be free of chestnut blight.
 Two of the largest surviving American chestnut trees are in Jackson County, Tennessee. One of them has been pollinated with hybrid pollen by members of The American Chestnut Foundation; the progeny will have mostly American chestnut genes and some will be blight resistant.
 On May 18, 2006, a biologist with the Georgia Department of Natural Resources spotted a stand of several trees near Warm Springs, Georgia.
 Another large tree was found in Talladega National Forest, Alabama, in June 2005.
 In the summer of 2007, a stand of trees was discovered near the northeastern Ohio town of Braceville. A combination of factors may account for the survival of these relatively large trees, including low levels of blight susceptibility, hypovirulence, and good site conditions. In particular, some stands may have avoided exposure due to being located at a higher altitude than blighted trees in the neighboring area; the fungal spores are not carried to higher altitudes as easily.
 In March 2008, officials of the Ohio Department of Natural Resources announced a rare adult American chestnut tree had been discovered in a marsh near Lake Erie. The officials admitted they had known about the tree for seven years, but had kept its existence a secret. The exact location of the tree is still being held secret, both because of the risk of infecting the tree and because an eagle has nested in its branches. The American Chestnut Foundation was also only recently told about the tree's existence.
 Members of the Kentucky chapter of the American Chestnut Foundation have been pollinating a tree found on a farm in Adair County, and a specimen found on Henderson Ridge in Elliott County. The Adair County tree is over one hundred years old.
 In June 2007, a mature American chestnut was discovered in Farmington, New Hampshire.
It is believed to be the result of nuts planted by early settlers in the area. The American Chestnut Council, located in the local town of Cadillac, Michigan, has verified its identity and existence. Efforts have been initiated to protect the property from logging and development.
 In Lansing, Michigan, Fenner Nature Center is home to a grove of blight-free American chestnuts descended from the aforementioned grove in Missaukee County.
 American chestnuts have been located on Beaver Island, a large island in northern Lake Michigan.
 Hundreds of healthy American chestnuts have been found in the proposed Chestnut Ridge Wilderness Area in the Allegheny National Forest in northwestern Pennsylvania. These trees will be protected from logging if the wilderness area, proposed by Friends of Allegheny Wilderness, is passed into law.
 The Montreal Botanical Garden has the American chestnut among its collection of trees and ornamental shrubs.
 Three of Portland, Oregon's heritage trees are American chestnuts, along with three Spanish (European) chestnuts.
 At least two American chestnuts live on the side of Skitchewaug Trail in Springfield, Vermont.
 Around 300 to 500 trees were spotted in the George Washington National Forest near Augusta County, Virginia, in 2014. Over one dozen trees were at least 12 inches in diameter with several measuring nearly 24 inches in diameter. Only one of the larger trees was a seed and pollen producer with numerous pods and pollen strands lying on ground. The site did, however, have a high presence of chestnut blight, although the seed producing tree and several other large ones were relatively blight-free with minimal to no damage.
 Two trees were planted 1985 in Nova Scotia, at Dalhousie University, Sexton Campus and are thriving. The donated trees were from saplings grown in Europe, away from the blight. They have 16" diameter trunks and are approximately 40 feet high.
 A single mature American chestnut can be found on the front lawn of the McPhail house heritage site in Sault Ste Marie, Ontario, planted by former mayor John Alexander McPhail in the 1920s. Well north of the natural range of the chestnut, it has avoided the blight.
 There is one American chestnut in Pennsylvania in the county of Columbia in the township of South Centre. It is a hardy, nut producing tree that has been producing for nearly 30 years.
 A solitary tree exists in the New York County of Orange, within the Town of Wawayanda. This was planted in the early 1990s as part of a local soil and water conservation district program to identify blight/resistant specimens. It has borne fruit since 2005.
 A lone but "perfect" American Chestnut tree grows on the Oakdale Campus in Coralville, Iowa.
 The great majority of chestnut trees in the United States are derived from Dunstan chestnuts, developed in Greensboro, N.C., in the 1960s.
The Canadian Chestnut Council has a plot growing and harvesting chestnut trees at Tim Hortons Children's Foundation Onondaga Farms. The seedlings are grown at a Simcoe, Ont, Canada station. They are then brought in the spring to this test plantation in St. George, Ont., between Brantford and Cambridge. 
Multiple chestnut trees are still alive and nut bearing in Wind River Arboretum, Washington State.

Uses

Food and medicine

The nuts were once an important economic resource in North America, being sold on the streets of towns and cities, as they sometimes still are during the Christmas season (usually said to be "roasting on an open fire" because their smell is readily identifiable many blocks away). Chestnuts are edible raw or roasted, though typically preferred roasted. Nuts of the European sweet chestnut are now sold instead in many stores. One must peel the brown skin to access the yellowish-white edible portion. Native Americans used various parts of the American chestnut to treat ailments such as whooping cough, heart conditions and chafed skin. The nuts were commonly fed on by various types of wildlife and was also in such a high abundance that they were commonly used to feed livestock by farmers, by allowing those livestock to roam freely into the forests that were predominantly filled with American chestnut trees. The American chestnut tree was also important to Native Americans as it acted as a food source for both the Native Americans and the wildlife often hunted as game.

The unrelated horse-chestnut's seeds are poisonous without extensive preparation.

Furniture and other wood products
The January 1888 issue of Orchard and Garden mentions the American chestnut as being "superior in quality to any found in Europe". The wood is straight-grained, strong, and easy to saw and split, and it lacks the radial end grain found on most other hardwoods. The tree was particularly valuable commercially since it grew at a faster rate than oaks. Being rich in tannins, the wood was highly resistant to decay and therefore used for a variety of purposes, including furniture, split-rail fences, shingles, home construction, flooring, piers, plywood, paper pulp, and telephone poles. Tannins were also extracted from the bark for tanning leather. Although larger trees are no longer available for milling, much chestnut wood has been reclaimed from historic barns to be refashioned into furniture and other items.

"Wormy" chestnut refers to a defective grade of wood that has insect damage, having been sawn from long-dead, blight-killed trees. This "wormy" wood has since become fashionable for its rustic character.

The American chestnut is not considered a particularly good patio shade tree because its droppings are prolific and a considerable nuisance. Catkins in the spring, spiny nut pods in the fall, and leaves in the early winter can all be a problem. These characteristics are more or less common to all shade trees, but perhaps not to the same degree as with the chestnut. The spiny seed pods are a particular nuisance when scattered over an area frequented by people.

See also
 American Chestnut Cooperators Foundation
 The American Chestnut Foundation
 Central and southern Appalachian montane oak forest

References

External links

 The American Chestnut Foundation
 American Chestnut Cooperators Foundation
 Canadian Chestnut Council
 American Chestnut Research and Restoration Center, SUNY-ESF
 

Castanea
Trees of North America
Edible nuts and seeds
Hardwood forest plants
Native American cuisine